The Cadillacs were an American rock and roll and doo-wop group from Harlem, New York, active from 1953 to 1962. The group was noted for their 1955 hit "Speedoo", written by Esther Navarro, which was instrumental in attracting white audiences to black rock and roll performers.

History
The group came together as The Carnations in 1953, with the members Earl Carroll (lead vocalist), Bobby Phillips, Lavern Drake (bass vocalist), and Gus Willingham. As the group moved into the recording studios, James "Poppa" Clark was added as a fifth member, and the name "The Cadillacs" was given to them. The group's first recording came in July 1954, with Josie Records #765, featuring "Gloria" and "I Wonder Why."

In 1955, Willingham and Clark left the group and were replaced by Earl Wade and Charles Brooks. At this time, the group first began to experiment with  choreography, suggested by manager Esther Navarro. Later that year came the group's biggest hit, "Speedoo", Carroll's nickname. Lavern Drake left the group in 1956 and was replaced by J. R. Bailey.

That same year the Cadillacs released a doo-wop version of "Rudolph the Red-Nosed Reindeer" that peaked at No. 11 on Billboard magazine's Rhythm & Blues Records chart.

In 1957 differences in opinion caused the group to split. One group was initially known as The Four Cadillacs, with current bass J. R. Bailey, former bass Lavern Drake, and new members Roland Martinez and Bobby Spencer. The previous year, Bobby Spencer had written the "My Boy Lollipop" pop song shuffle for Barbie Gaye, which was played by Alan Freed and secured Barbie Gaye a spot in his 1956 Christmas Show opening for Little Richard. In 1964, an Ernest Ranglin produced ska version of the song became a multi-million seller for Jamaican teenager Millie Small and made producer Chris Blackwell rich, leading to further development of his Island Records label.

The other four current members - Carroll, Wade, Brooks, and Phillips - continued recording separately, later as Earl Carroll and the Cadillacs. Bailey's group also included former group saxophonist Jesse "Tex" Powell, and recorded in early 1958 as Jesse Powell and the Caddys. Both groups recorded simultaneously on Josie Records. Later in 1958, the groups combined back into one. Carroll's backup vocalists, Wade, Brooks, and Phillips, all decided to retire and Carroll joined Bailey, Drake, Martinez and Spencer. Carroll's lead spot had been given to Spencer and Bailey, and he left shortly thereafter, creating a new group, Speedo and the Pearls, which recorded briefly in 1959. In 1959, the Cadillacs were also featured in the movie Go Johnny, Go.

The group split and re-formed in 1960, with Carroll, Martinez, Kirk Davis, and bass Ronnie Bright. Later the group was Carroll, Martinez, the returning Bobby Spencer, Milton Love, and Reggie Barnes. Martinez, Love and Barnes were all members of The Solitares at one time.

In 1961, the group began to resemble The Coasters in their music. The lineup shifted again, now with Carroll, Martinez, Curtis Williams, Ray Brewster, and Irving Lee Gail. Carroll was out by 1962 to enter the group they'd been emulating, The Coasters, with Carl Gardner, Billy Guy, and Will "Dub" Jones. 1963 also ended the group's run on Josie Records.

Brewster and Martinez brought in former members Bobby Spencer and J. R. Bailey and continued to record through 1963. The group split, with Bailey joining the Jive Five. Brewster brought in former Cadillac/Solitare Milton Love with Solitares Bobby Baylor and Fred Barksdale. This group recorded briefly in 1964. Spencer became lead vocalist, with Joey Levine (Ohio Express, Reunion) as backing vocalist, for Crazy Elephant, a bubblegum music group, in 1969.

The Cadillacs were back in 1970 with J. R. Bailey, Bobby Spencer, original member Bobby Phillips (who had retired from Speedo's group during the split), and new member Leroy Binns, of The Charts. Stephen Brown later replaced Phillips. Teddy Pendergrass came on as the group's drummer. The group split into the mid-1970s and some members joined Harold Melvin and the Blue Notes, including Teddy Pendergrass as drummer ( Pendergrass would later transition to the lead singer for Harold Melvin and the Blue Notes). 

In 1979, Earl Carroll, Earl Wade, Bobby Phillips, and Johnny Brown came together for two Subaru commercials in which they sang, "Cadillac drives Subaru," as part of the automaker's "car names" campaign.

Stephen Brown had joined Cleveland Still's Dubs In the Mid-80s.

Stephen Brown died on January 20, 1989.

Carroll had remained with the Coasters during this time, and left in the early 1990s to permanently re-form the Cadillacs with Phillips, Brown, Gary K. Lewis, and musical director Eddie Jones. Johnny Brown left in 2003. Phillips died on March 6, 2011.

Earl "Speedo" Carroll died on November 25, 2012.

Awards and recognition
The Cadillacs were inducted into The Vocal Group Hall of Fame in 2004.

Discography

Singles

References

External links
"The Cadillacs", Vocal Group Hall of Fame.
[ The Cadillacs at AllMusic]
"Zoom: The Story of the Cadillacs"
"Speedo & the Cadillacs", Golden Oldies Forever.

Rock music groups from New York (state)
Doo-wop groups
Rock and roll music groups
Vocal quartets
Josie Records artists
Smash Records artists
Musical groups from Harlem